David Battisti (born 1956) is The Tamaki Endowed Chair of Atmospheric Sciences at the University of Washington and a fellow at the American Geophysical Union. His research interests include understanding how interactions between the ocean, land, atmosphere, and sea ice lead to climatic variability at timescales that vary from seasonal to decadal timescales, as well as the paleoclimate. He is also interested in how climate variability (including El Nino) affects food production.

He received his PhD in 1988 at the University of Washington Department of Atmospheric Sciences. He has published over 100 papers in peer-review journals in atmospheric sciences and oceanography.

He also helps organize an annual set of climate dynamics courses.

References

External links
 Personal website
 

University of Washington faculty
Living people
1956 births
University of Washington College of the Environment alumni
Place of birth missing (living people)